James Hamilton, nicknamed "Sunny Jim", was an American Negro league pitcher in the 1910s.

Hamilton played for the Kansas City Royal Giants in 1911. In three recorded appearances on the mound, he posted a 3.09 ERA over 11.2 innings.

References

External links
Baseball statistics and player information from Baseball-Reference Black Baseball Stats and Seamheads

Year of birth missing
Year of death missing
Place of birth missing
Place of death missing
Kansas City Royal Giants players
Baseball pitchers